Elsbeth Ruth Juda (née Goldstein) and known professionally as Jay (2 May 1911 – 5 July 2014), was a British photographer most notable for her pioneering fashion photographs and work as associate editor and photographer for The Ambassador magazine between 1940 and 1965.

Early life 
She was born in Darmstadt, Germany on 2 May 1911 to Margarete Neumann (1885–1954) and Julius Joel Goldstein (1873–1929), a philosopher. As a young woman, she moved to Paris, where she found work as secretary to a banker. In 1931, Elsbeth married her childhood love, Hans Peter Juda (1904–1975), and they went to live in Berlin where he was a financial editor at the Berliner Tageblatt. In 1933, they fled Nazi Germany for London with nothing but two suitcases and a violin.

Career 
Juda studied photography under the Bauhaus photographer Lucia Moholy, the wife of the artist László Moholy-Nagy. At the time Juda and her husband Hans lived in London, where Hans was the publisher of a British trade magazine called The Ambassador, for which László Moholy-Nagy was the Art Director. Lucia Moholy would visit Juda at her home to teach her photography. Soon after, Juda did a stint as a "dark room boy" at the Scaioni Studio in London. She later worked as a photographer for advertising companies and fashion magazines, including Harper's Bazaar .

The Ambassador 
Hans and Elsbeth Juda originally opened a London satellite office for the Dutch trade magazine International Textiles. After 1940, however, when Amsterdam came under control of the Germany army, the magazine proved too difficult to continue. In March 1946 the Judas changed the name of the publication to The Ambassador and changed its focus to British industry, trade and exports. The magazine was influential from its inception and encouraged by the British Government, who helped by ensuring a continual supply of paper during the war. Indeed, The Ambassador, The British Export Magazine became the voice of British manufacturing for export when the nation's trade was struggling to emerge after 1945. It was published monthly in four languages (English, German, French and Portuguese), had subscribers in over ninety countries, and a circulation of 23,000 copies.
 
Juda's husband, Hans, coined the official motto "Export or Die" for The Ambassador. Later, as the magazine became an essential marketing and press journal for a Britain desperate to reestablish itself as a global exporter in the post-war era, the phrase would become a mantra for the national manufacturing industry. Throughout their work during the 1940s, 1950s and 1960s, Juda and her husband became two of the United Kingdom's greatest champions for export, constantly promoting every facet of British manufacturing, culture and the arts and, in the process, coming into close contact with a host of distinguished artists, writers, designers and photographers. The critic Robert Melville described Ambassador as "the most daring and enterprising trade journal ever conceived...no other magazine...has so consistently and brilliantly demonstrated the relevance of works of art to the problems of industrial design."

Juda's shoots for The Ambassador combined elements of fashion, modernism and trade. Her series of photos of the famed British model Barbara Goalen modeling Scottish textiles among the heavy machinery of working textile factory are especially representative of her unique visual aesthetics. Together they built a considerable art collection from the many artists that they came in contact with at The Ambassador. It is a much wider circle of friends, however, which would allow Jay to capture every facet of a reemerging post-war Britain through the lens of her camera. The magazine was bought by Thomson Publications in 1961 and continued to be published until 1972.

Exhibition – L’Equipement des Arts
In 2009 the gallery L’Equipement des Arts held a long overdue and immensely successful exhibition of Elsbeth Juda's Photographs from 1940 to 1965.
L’Equipement des Arts coordinated an extensive research and academic project to find and retrieve materiel from The Ambassador Archive at the V&A Museum to make the exhibition possible. This culminated with negatives being loaned by the V&A Museum and National Portrait Gallery to produce 140 historic prints, many of which had never been seen or shown before.

These include a unique record of Graham Sutherland's ill-fated portrait of Sir Winston Churchill commissioned by the House of Commons to celebrate his 80th birthday. The exhibition also showed, for the first time, a series of photographs which illustrate Elsbeth Juda's unprecedented access to Henry Moore and his studio as he worked on the sculpture King and Queen.

The exhibition featured dramatic photographs of a model draped in only fabric and photographed on the roof of Lancashire mill to promote the British textile industry. Among the many leading artists of the day photographed by Juda are Joe Tilson, William Scott, Lynn Chadwick, Osbert Lancaster, and Peter Blake. So were the era's leading models including Barbara Goalen, Fiona Campbell-Walter, Lisa Fonssagrives-Penn, Shelagh Wilson, and Marla Scarafia.

Further, famous personalities of the time such as Margot Fonteyn, Richard Burton, Anthony Armstrong-Jones, and Peter Ustinov; and friends like Norman Parkinson, Mark Boxer, and Madge Garland were all affectionately portrayed.

Juda used locations to provide unexpected theatrical backdrops to her work and was able to take full advantage of the new age of jet travel. She was sent to worldwide destinations on assignments for The Ambassador Magazine.

Juda’s photographs display wit and a wild humor. However—and more importantly—her work reveals a creativity that pushed the perceived boundaries of fashion photography at the time. Her poignant images reflect a bygone era, but remain ahead of their time and are especially relevant today.

L’Equipement des Arts presentation of Elsbeth Juda photographs in 2009 was the first and only major exhibition of her photographic work. A number of articles cited below in notes and references were for the most part a result of this exhibition.

Portraits
Juda was a portraitist who photographed many British artists of the 1950 and 1960s, including Henry Moore, John Piper (artist), Graham Sutherland, Kenneth Armitage, and Peter Blake (artist).

Churchill portrait by Graham Sutherland 
Juda was present to photograph and document Graham Sutherland's portrait of Sir Winston Churchill, which was commissioned in 1954 by the past and present members of the House of Lords and the House of Commons of the United Kingdom in celebration of Churchill's eightieth birthday. Sutherland's resulting controversial portrait became infamous because Churchill openly hated it and stated that it "makes me look half-witted." After it was publicly unveiled in Westminster Hall on 30 November 1954, Sutherland's portrait was hidden and then destroyed (by order of Lady Churchill).

Juda's photographs record the day when an elderly Churchill can be seen being posed by Sutherland. Churchill's vigour was fading; in the previous year he had suffered a stroke and, although he had recovered, the effects of age and illness were increasingly apparent. He also drank heavily at lunchtime. According to Juda, during the session Graham Sutherland would say, 'A little more of the old lion, sir' and he'd sit up and then flop after a minute.

British Fortnights
Juda started themed months called British Fortnights at the American department stores Lord and Taylor and Neiman Marcus in an effort to promote British brands and goods. Juda was initially approached to create a British Fortnight at Neiman Marcus in Dallas, Texas by Stanley Marcus, who was a fan of The Ambassador. Stanley Marcus and Juda eventually become close friends, with Marcus even setting up a trip for Juda to visit the Kodak company in Rochester, New York and the studios of Richard Avedon and Irving Penn.

Legacy
In 1980 Juda presented the National Portrait Gallery a collection of bromide prints, negatives, contact sheets, and news cuttings relating to her photographs of Winston Churchill and Graham Sutherland. In 1987 Juda donated The Ambassador archives to the Victoria and Albert Museum. The most complete sets of Juda's archives can be found in the British Library and the Victoria and Albert Museum.

See also
Maurice Broomfield
Bill Brandt

Notes and references
 

Lipman, Maureen. "My best friends are old – but only in body.", The Guardian, 2006-03-31. Retrieved 2009-06-29.
Lederman, Erika. "Photographer Juda Captures Supermodel on Skis, Aging Churchill.", Bloomberg L.P., 2009-05-03. Retrieved 2009-06-29.
Fallyrag, the Arts and Culture Journal. "Milling Around Lancashire.", Fallyrag, 2009-04-24. Retrieved 2009-06-29.
Ibell, Paul. "Perspectives.", New Statesman, 2006-05-21. Retrieved 2009-06-29.
Mohammed, Michael and Anscombe, Isabelle. "Elsbeth Juda JAY Photographs 1940 -1965.", 'L'Equipement des Arts Exhibition and Catalog'  Retrieved on 2009-06-29.

External links 

 
 Jewish Museum London: Elsbeth Juda Grit and Glamour exhbibition
 Art UK: Elsbeth Juda
 AnOther: The female Jewish photographer and art director you've never heard of

1911 births
2014 deaths
Photographers from Hesse
Fashion photographers
Jewish emigrants from Nazi Germany to the United Kingdom
Photographers from London
British centenarians
British women photographers
Women centenarians
Artists from Darmstadt